Extreme Hardship is a legal term in the United States of America's Immigration Law.

United States Immigration Law: Extreme Hardship
In U.S. Immigration law effects of certain grounds to deportability and inadmissibility can be waived, under the discretion of the USCIS adjudicator or immigration court. Several waivers are available by the statute of immigration codes while some other require showing "extreme hardship" potentially caused to a qualifying family member (the US citizen or legal permanent resident's close relatives) of the defendant (person excluded from admission or being removed).

Note that the hardship to the defendant is not relevant here, only the hardship caused to the qualifying family by removing the defendant or excluding him from admission. The waivers are governed by INA 212 and INA 237 (potentially some others: add?). The United States Waiver of Inadmissibility application is required for INA 212 waivers, while INA 237 waivers do not have such application.

Meaning
Here is a quote from BIA (Board of Immigration Appeals) rejecting appeal of a waiver:
"U.S. court decisions have repeatedly held that the common results of deportation or exclusion are insufficient to prove extreme hardship. See Hassan v. INS, 927 F.2d 465, 468 (9th Cir. 1991). For example, Matter of Pilch, 21 I&N Dec. 627 (BIA 1996), held that emotional hardship caused by severing family and community ties is a common result of deportation and does not constitute extreme hardship. In addition, Perez v. INS, 96 F.3d 390 (9th Cir. 1996), held that the common results of deportation are insufficient to prove extreme hardship and defined extreme hardship as hardship that was unusual or beyond that which would normally be expected upon deportation. Hassan v. INS, supra, held further that the uprooting of family and separation from friends does not necessarily amount to extreme hardship but rather represents the type of inconvenience
and hardship experienced by the families of most aliens being deported. The AAO recognizes that the applicant's spouse and/or children would likely endure hardship as a result of separation from the applicant.
However, their situation, if they remain in the United States, is typical to individuals separated as a result of deportation or exclusion and does not rise to the level of extreme hardship."

Qualifying Family Member
There are two levels of qualifying family members, depending on what grounds the waiver is for.

In case of INS 212(i) or 237 (other?):
US citizen or LPR parents
US citizen or LPR spouse

Additionally, in case of 212(h) waivers
US citizen or LPR children

Notes

External links
Waiver of Inadmissibility (I-601) application.
Matter of Cervantes (good explanation of extreme hardship in the case law).
hardship.aspx BIA decision stating that family separation does not constitute extreme hardship.
Article explaining the levels of "hardship".

United States immigration law